Christofer David (born Christofer Gurkan, 6 March 1993) is a Dutch professional footballer who plays as a midfielder for Turkish TFF Third League club Yeni Mersin İdmanyurdu.

Club career

Early career
Born in Amsterdam, Netherlands, David's family moved to Enschede when he was 3 years old. He joined FC Twente youth team at the age of seven and moved through the age groups at the Dutch club.

In 2010, together with his family, he switched the Turkish surname Gurkan for his originally Aramaic surname David.

Fulham
Former Fulham manager Martin Jol signed David, who was also attracting attention from Ajax on 4 January 2013 from Dutch club FC Twente.

David made his Fulham debut in the FA Cup third round against Norwich City at Carrow Road. On 11 May, the final day of the season with Fulham already relegated, David scored on his Premier League debut in the dying seconds to tie the game against Crystal Palace. Despite being featured for five matches at the start of the 2014–15 season and aiming for first team football, David's first team opportunities were soon limited under new manager Kit Symons.

Twente
On 31 January 2015, it was announced that David was sent on loan to his former club FC Twente until the end of the season. The club has the possibility to make the deal permanent. David did previously hint his return after they were relegated to the Football League Championship.

However, David was placed in the Jong FC Twente squad instead and made his debut against Almere City on 6 February 2015. David made his senior FC Twente debut on 22 February 2015, coming on as a substitute for Bilal Ould-Chikh in the 60th minute, in a 2–1 loss against Vitesse Arnhem. David made another league appearance, in a 1–1 draw against NAC Breda on 28 February 2015. After this, David continued to play for Jong FC Twente throughout the season. David was captain and scored his first goal, in a 2–2 draw against Volendam on 3 April 2015. David scored his second goal in the last game of the season against Achilles '29. At the end of the 2014–15 season, the club decided not to take up options to sign David permanently, as the club's financial problem believed to be the main factor.

Upon returning to Fulham, David was among nine players to be released by the club.

Go Ahead Eagles
On 14 August 2015, it was announced that David has been signed by Dutch Eerste Divisie side Go Ahead Eagles.

Cape Town City
On 23 February 2019, Cape Town City announced the signing of David on a contract until June 2021.

Club statistics

References

External links
 
 
 
 
 
 Netherlands profile at OnsOranje

1993 births
Living people
Footballers from Amsterdam
Dutch footballers
FC Twente players
Fulham F.C. players
Go Ahead Eagles players
FC Utrecht players
Cape Town City F.C. (2016) players
Würzburger Kickers players
SSV Jeddeloh players
Association football forwards
Premier League players
English Football League players
Eredivisie players
Eerste Divisie players
South African Premier Division players
Liga Leumit players
Dutch expatriate footballers
Expatriate footballers in England
Expatriate soccer players in South Africa
Expatriate footballers in Germany
Expatriate footballers in Turkey
Dutch expatriate sportspeople in England
Dutch expatriate sportspeople in South Africa
Dutch expatriate sportspeople in Germany
Dutch expatriate sportspeople in Turkey
Netherlands youth international footballers
Jong FC Twente players